Lagenophora is a genus of flowering plants in the family Asteraceae. Species occur in South-east Asia, Australia, New Zealand, as well as Central and South America.

 Species
 Lagenophora barkeri Kirk - New Zealand 
 Lagenophora cuchumatanica Beaman & De Jong - Guatemala
 Lagenophora cuneata Petrie - New Zealand 
 Lagenophora gibbsiae Merr. - Borneo
 Lagenophora gunniana Steetz - Australia
 Lagenophora gracilis Steetz
 Lagenophora hariotii (Franch.) Franch. - Argentina, Chile incl. Juan Fernández Islands
 Lagenophora hirsuta (Poeppig ex Less.) Dudley - Argentina, Chile 
 Lagenophora huegelii Benth. - Australia
 Lagenophora lanata A.Cunn. - Japan, Taiwan, New Zealand
 Lagenophora mikadoi (Koidz.) Koidz. ex H.Koyama - Japan
 Lagenophora montana Hook.f. - Australia, New Zealand
 Lagenophora nudicaulis (Comm. ex Lam.) Dusén - Argentina, Chile 
 Lagenophora petiolata Hook.f. - New Zealand 
 Lagenophora pinnatifida Hook.f. - New Zealand 
 Lagenophora pumila (G.Forst.) Cheeseman - New Zealand 
 Lagenophora stipitata (Labill.) Druce - blue bottle-daisy, common lagenophora - Australia, New Zealand, Southeast Asia, China, Indian Subcontinent
 Lagenophora strangulata Colenso - New Zealand

Destruction of specimens
In 2017, Australian customs officials destroyed 106 herbarium specimens of Lagenophora that Australian scientists were attempting to re-import into the country, but the specimens' documentation was insufficient. The specimens dated to as early as the 1790s, and included six type specimens. As a result of this incident, many worldwide institutions put a temporary ban on sending museum specimens to Australia.

References

 
Asteraceae genera